= Aysit Tansel =

Turkish economist

Aysit Tansel is a Turkish economist whose research focuses on labour economics, including the economics of education, wages and labour-market outcomes. She has been associated with the Middle East Technical University (METU) in Ankara. Her research has examined topics including education, gender and employment.

== Education and career ==
Tansel graduated from Adana Girls High School as the top student of her class. She earned her BS degree from Middle East Technical University (METU) with highest honors in 1968 while on a Kennedy Scholarship, followed by an M.A. in economics from the University of Minnesota in 1972 and a PhD in economics from Binghamton University (State University of New York) in 1979.

From 1979 to 1980, she worked at Abt Associates on research and evaluation projects for the U.S. Department of Labor. She subsequently worked as an assistant professor at the State University of New York and then at Wilkes University before returning to METU in 1983. At METU, she was promoted to associate professor in 1986 and became a full professor in 1994. She has also been affiliated with the IZA Institute of Labor Economics, the Economic Research Forum and the Global Labor Organization.

She served as vice president of the ILKYAR Foundation from 2010 to 2013 and has been associated with the foundation. She has also been involved with the selection committee of Bilkent University's Oğuz Tansel Literature Award.

Tansel has performed editorial work for journals including Economics of Education Review, International Journal of Education Economics and Development, and Equality, Diversity and Inclusion.

== Research ==
Tansel's research interests include economic growth, gender inequality, returns to education, female labour-force participation, brain drain, internal migration and health economics. Her published work has examined job satisfaction in Britain; school attainment and private tutoring in Turkey; the effects of illness on wages and labour supply in Côte d’Ivoire and Ghana; and public- and private-sector employment and gender wage differences in Turkey.

In 2025, Tansel co-authored studies on wage effects associated with educational mismatch in public and private sectors, and on wage differences among Turkish college graduates by field of study. A 2026 co-authored study examined the relationship between vision problems, employment and household income in Turkey using data from the 2019 and 2022 Turkey Health Survey.
